Winchester Science Centre (previously known as INTECH) is a hands-on, interactive, science and technology centre located in Morn Hill, just outside the city of Winchester in Hampshire, England. The centre opened in 2002 after grants from Millennium Commission, IBM, SEEDA and Hampshire County Council to replace an existing facility. It is a registered charity under English law.

The centre houses a range of interactive exhibits, aimed at a core audience of children aged 5–12 years old. The dome's planetarium seats 168.

Description
The centre has two floors of hands-on science exhibits and a planetarium, with a programme of full-dome films and presenter-led shows. A new zone "Explorer Space "opened in 2018. The Invention Studio allows children to explore science-themed activities.

Additionally, the centre's education team runs workshops for schools.

As part of STEMNET in Hampshire and the Isle of Wight, the centre organises STEM Ambassadors who volunteer their time to secondary schools.

There are monthly "After Dark" events and space lectures for adults.

References

External links
Official site

Museums in Hampshire
Education in Winchester
Educational institutions established in 2002
Planetaria in the United Kingdom
2002 establishments in England
Science centres in England
Charities based in England